Ewood Bridge may refer to:

Ewood Bridge, former Haslingden F.C. football ground, also used by Stand Athletic F.C.
former name of Ewood Park, ground of Blackburn Rovers F.C.
Ewood Bridge and Edenfield railway station, in Rossendale